The 2017 Monte-Carlo Masters was a tennis tournament for male professional players, played from 16 April through 23 April 2017, on outdoor clay courts. It was the 111th edition of the annual Monte Carlo Masters tournament, sponsored by Rolex for the ninth time. It took place at the Monte Carlo Country Club in Roquebrune-Cap-Martin, France (though billed as Monte Carlo, Monaco).

Points
Because the Monte Carlo Masters is the non-mandatory Masters 1000 event, special rules regarding points distribution are in place. The Monte Carlo Masters counts as one of a player's 500 level tournaments, while distributing Masters 1000 points.

Singles main draw entrants

Seeds

Rankings are as of April 10, 2017

Other entrants
The following players received wildcards into the main draw:
  Jérémy Chardy
  Borna Ćorić
  Casper Ruud
  Andreas Seppi

The following players received entry using a protected ranking:
  Tommy Haas
  Tommy Robredo

The following players received entry from the qualifying draw:
  Carlos Berlocq
  Guillermo García López
  Martin Kližan
  Andrey Kuznetsov
  Adrian Mannarino
  Renzo Olivo
  Jan-Lennard Struff

The following players received entry as lucky losers:
  Damir Džumhur
  Pierre-Hugues Herbert

Withdrawals
Before the tournament
  David Ferrer →replaced by  Daniil Medvedev
  Richard Gasquet →replaced by  Nikoloz Basilashvili
  Philipp Kohlschreiber →replaced by   Pierre-Hugues Herbert
  Nick Kyrgios →replaced by  Damir Džumhur
  Gaël Monfils →replaced by  Nicolás Almagro
  Milos Raonic →replaced by  Tommy Robredo

Retirements
  Adrian Mannarino

Doubles main draw entrants

Seeds

 Rankings are as of April 10, 2017

Other entrants
The following pairs received wildcards into the doubles main draw:
  Romain Arneodo /  Hugo Nys 
  Grigor Dimitrov /  Nenad Zimonjić

The following pair received entry as alternates:
  Paolo Lorenzi /  Albert Ramos Viñolas

Withdrawals
Before the tournament
  Philipp Kohlschreiber

Finals

Singles

  Rafael Nadal def.  Albert Ramos Viñolas, 6–1, 6–3

Doubles

   Rohan Bopanna /  Pablo Cuevas def.  Feliciano López /  Marc López, 6–3, 3–6, [10–4]

References

External links
 
 Association of Tennis Professionals (ATP) tournament profile